Microcorys is a genus of flowering plants in the family Lamiaceae, first described in 1810. The entire genus is endemic to Australia.

Species
 Microcorys barbata R.Br. - Western Australia
 Microcorys boxwood Newbey - Western Australia
 Microcorys capitata (Bartl.) Benth. - Western Australia
 Microcorys cephalantha B.J.Conn - Western Australia
 Microcorys elliptica B.J.Conn - Northern Territory
 Microcorys eremophiloides Kenneally - Western Australia
 Microcorys ericifolia Benth.  - Western Australia
 Microcorys exserta Benth.  - Western Australia
 Microcorys glabra (Bartl.) Benth. - Western Australia
 Microcorys lenticularis F.Muell. - Western Australia
 Microcorys loganiacea F.Muell. - Western Australia
 Microcorys longiflora F.Muell. - Western Australia
 Microcorys longifolia (Benth.) Benth. - Western Australia
 Microcorys macredieana F.Muell. - Northern Territory
 Microcorys obovata Benth. - Western Australia
 Microcorys pimeloides F.Muell. - Western Australia
 Microcorys purpurea R.Br. - Western Australia
 Microcorys queenslandica C.T.White - Queensland
 Microcorys subcanescens Benth. - Western Australia
 Microcorys tenuifolia Benth. - Western Australia
 Microcorys virgata R.Br. - Western Australia
 Microcorys wilsoniana B.J.Conn - Western Australia

References

Lamiaceae
Lamiaceae genera
Endemic flora of Australia